was the lead ship of her class of four escort ships built for the Imperial Japanese Navy during World War II.

Background and description
The Japanese called these ships  Kaibōkan, "ocean defence ships", (Kai = sea, ocean, Bo = defence, Kan = ship), to denote a multi-purpose vessel. They were initially intended for patrol and fishery protection, minesweeping and as convoy escorts.

The main armament of the Shimushu class consisted of three Type 3  guns in single mounts, one superfiring pair aft and one mount forward of the superstructure. They were built with four Type 96  anti-aircraft guns in two twin-gun mounts, but the total was increased to 15 guns by August 1943. A dozen depth charges were stowed aboard initially, but this was doubled in May 1942 when their minesweeping gear was removed. The anti-submarine weaponry later rose to 60 depth charges with a Type 97  trench mortar and six depth charge throwers.

Construction and career
Shimushu participated in the landings in Thailand, escorting the 55th IJA Infantry Division to landings at Nakhon on 8 December 1941. She also escorted various other invasion convoys to Malaya, Sumatra, and Palembang. Using her sonar, she located the British battlecruiser  on 29 January 1942, being the first ship to locate the submerged wreck.

After that convoy disaster, the Naval General staff discontinued assigning only one escort to convoys and organized larger convoys with more escorts.

Shimushu participated in the TA No. 2 and 3, the Japanese effort to hold Leyte island, and claimed one of the five B-25 Mitchell medium bombers lost in the first wave. On 25 November, Shimushu was torpedoed by the submarine  and lost her bow, and was repaired by 20 January 1945. The ship spent more than a year on repatriation duty and was ceded to the Soviet Union on 5 July 1947. The ship served in the Soviet Pacific Ocean Fleet as patrol ship EK-31 (1947), dispatch ship PS-25 (1948), repair ship PM-74 (1957). She was decommissioned on 16 May 1959 and scrapped.

Notes

References

External links
http://www.combinedfleet.com/Shimushu_t.htm

World War II naval ships of Japan
Shimushu-class escort ships
1939 ships
Ships built by Mitsui Engineering and Shipbuilding
Patrol vessels of the Soviet Navy